The popularity of the electric guitar and the acoustic guitar in music from the mid-20th century has led to various instrument manufacturers producing signature models that are endorsed by an artist.

A

B

C

D

E

F

G

H

I

J

K

L

M

N

O

P

Q

R

S

T

U

V

W

X

Y

Z

See also
 List of guitars
 List of signature model bass guitars

References

guitar